The Law on Social Responsibility on Radio and Television (Ley de Responsabilidad Social en Radio y Televisión known as the Ley Resorte) is a Venezuelan law, adopted by the National Assembly and in force since 7 December 2004. Its purpose is to establish a legal framework for the social responsibility of radio and television broadcasters, national and independent producers of radio and TV programming, and viewers and listeners in the dissemination and reception of transmitted information.

Content 

Its objectives, stated in Article 3, are: “[securing] respect for freedom of expression and information without censorship”; “[furthering] the actual exercise of and respect for human rights”; “[facilitating] the broadcasting of information and materials intended for minors”; “[furthering] the broadcasting of national productions and [encouraging] the development of the national audiovisual industry”; “[facilitating]the dissemination of the values of the Venezuelan culture”; and “[furthering]public participation.”

Article 4 of the law allows the use of indigenous languages in programs directed specifically to indigenous peoples, and makes it a requirement to provide subtitles or sign language translation in informative programs for people with auditory disabilities.

Article 14 supports national production of TV and radio content - including music - by requiring broadcasters to transmit at least 10 hours of Venezuelan-made content every day.

The government called it a "building block for the modernization of the country's communications sector", whereas the opposition believes it increases state control over the media. According to Human Rights Watch, the law "severely threatens press freedom in Venezuela", and "[i]ts vaguely worded restrictions and heavy penalties are a recipe for self-censorship by the press and arbitrariness by government authorities."

Features
The law's purpose is to instruct the Venezuelan television networks to air cultural content and to establish schedules for each category of the series and programs. The rating for each program is based on four content types: Language, health, sex, and violence; when a program is about to be broadcast, these content issues can either be announced with their respective "level measure" or not, depending on the channel's way to show the advice. Also, depending on the schedule and the advised contents, the program may either be suitable, in need of parental guidance or non-suitable for young children and teenagers. It is also specified if the series is a national production (made by the channel), an independent national production (made by a separate company) or an international production (a foreign program).

Likewise, every network is instructed to air the government's teasers, their political campaigns and to interrupt the usual schedule when national announcements by the President of the Republic, known as Cadenas ("Chains", referring to the fact that every radio and TV network must air simultaneously these announcements) are about to be broadcast.

See also
 Censorship in Venezuela
 Media of Venezuela
 Television content rating system
 Watershed (broadcasting)

References

External links
Ley de Responsabilidad Social en Radio y Televisión Full text of law 

Media law
Censorship in Venezuela
Broadcasting in Venezuela
Law of Venezuela